TD Waterhouse Canada Inc. is a Canadian financial services corporation headquartered in Toronto, Ontario and owned by Toronto-Dominion Bank. The company does business through several divisions, TD Direct Investing, TD Wealth Financial Planning, and TD Wealth Private Investment Advice. The TD Waterhouse brand was also formerly used for TD's American and British brokerages.

History 
TD's original brokerage, Greenline Investor Services, was established in 1984. Greenline Investor Services merged with Gardiner Group Stockholders in 1987, becoming the first Canadian bank to purchase seats on the Toronto, Montreal, Vancouver and Alberta stock exchanges. In 1993, Greenline Investor Services acquired the operations of Marathon Brokerage, a Canadian discount brokerage. The TD Waterhouse brand originated as an American brand for discount brokerage when TD purchased Waterhouse Securities in 1996. The name TD Waterhouse was formed and was used for TD's British, Canadian, and American brokerage activities. In Canada, TD Waterhouse thus replaced the brand Greenline.

In 1996, TD became the first online broker in Canada with the launch of WebBroker. In June 1999, TD spun off 42 million shares or 12.4% of TD Waterhouse in an IPO, with shares priced at $35.28 CAD or US$24 per share, earning US$1.01 billion. In 2001, with the bursting of the dot-com bubble and lower trade volumes that brought down Waterhouse's share price, TD bought back that minority stake at US$9 per share for only US$378 million, earning a tidy profit on the privatization. The acquisition was conditional on TD owning at least 90 percent of Waterhouse's outstanding common shares, and it owned almost 89 percent when the privatization was announced.

In 2003, Toronto–Dominion Bank held talks to merge Waterhouse with E*TRADE, which would have created the second-largest discount broker in the United States after Charles Schwab, but the two sides could not come to an agreement over control of the merged entity. In 2005, E*TRADE made an unsolicited offer for Ameritrade, then the second-largest US discount broker. However, Ameritrade instead purchased TD Waterhouse USA, with TD Bank holding a 39% stake in the new entity. As part of the deal, Ameritrade sold its Canadian operations to TD Bank who merged them with TD Waterhouse Canada. When TD merged its U.S. brokerage activities with Ameritrade, the newly formed U.S. broker formed the brand TD Ameritrade (of which TD owns 39%), but the Canadian division (100% owned by TD) retained the TD Waterhouse brand.

In December 2012, TD replaced the TD Waterhouse Discount Brokerage brand with TD Direct Investing. TD Direct Investing Europe, a discount broking subsidiary in the United Kingdom (with headquarters in Leeds) which also used the TD Waterhouse brand, was sold in 2016 to Interactive Investor in a deal financed by JC Flowers.

Services

TD Direct Investing 
TD Direct Investing is the online brokerage division of TD Waterhouse. TD Direct Investing provides several platforms to trade Canadian and U.S. stocks and options with commissions, and mutal funds, fixed income investments, such as bonds, GICs, and T-Bills, exchange-traded funds, as well as IPOs commission-free. The brokerage has several trading platforms that investors can use, WebBroker, the TD app, the Advanced Dashboard, and thinkorswim. TD Direct Investing offers several types of accounts such as margin account, cash accounts, self-directed tax-free savings accounts, self-directed registered retirement savings plan, registered education savings plans, and life income funds. The brokerage also offers online educational resources for learning how to trade assets and how to invest.

TD Wealth 
The TD Wealth brand refers to services provided by TD Waterhouse and its parent company TD Bank that provide advice and management of wealth and investments. TD Wealth Financial Planning is the division of TD Waterhouse the provides financial planning. TD Wealth Private Investment Advice is the division that provides private wealth management services. It works with clients to produce an investment strategy and provides them with portfolio management services. The services, along with other TD services from different subsidiaries and divisions of TD Bank, provide TD Wealth Private Wealth Management, a suite of products and services for private wealth management.

References 

Toronto-Dominion Bank
Stock brokerages and investment banks of Canada